The 2014 Big Ten Conference men's soccer tournament was the 24th postseason tournament to determine the champion of the Big Ten Conference. The defending champion was Indiana. The tournament was held from November 8–16, 2014.

Bracket

Schedule

Play-in round

Quarterfinals

Semifinals

Final

Statistical leaders

See also 
 Big Ten Conference Men's Soccer Tournament
 2014 Big Ten Conference men's soccer season
 2014 NCAA Division I men's soccer season
 2014 NCAA Division I Men's Soccer Championship

References

External links 
 Tournament Bracket
 Tournament Scores

Big Ten Men's Soccer Tournament
Big Ten Men's Soccer Tournament
Big Ten Men's Soccer Tournament
Big Ten Men's Soccer Tournament